Sarakinoi (before 1925: Σαρακίνοβο - Sarakinovo) is a village and a community in the municipal unit of Aridaia in the western Pella regional unit, Greece. In 2011 its population was 351 for the village and 413 for the community, which includes the village Kato Koryfi. Sarakinoi is located in the southeastern part of the Voras Mountains, at 640 m elevation. It is 5 km west of Polykarpi, 6 km south of Loutraki, 11 km southwest of Aridaia and 15 km northwest of Edessa. Forests cover most of the area.

Demographics
Sarakinoi had 356 inhabitants in 1981. In fieldwork done by Riki Van Boeschoten in late 1993, Sarakinoi was populated by Slavophones. The Macedonian language was used by people of all ages, both in public and private settings, and as the main language for interpersonal relationships. Some elderly villagers had little knowledge of Greek.

Notable people
Aggelis Gatsos, Greek Revolutionary
Petros Gatsos, Greek Revolutionary
Dimitrios Gatsos, Greek Revolutionary, Lieutenant general of the Hellenic Army
Alexandros Giovannos, commander in the Greek Struggle for Macedonia
Hristo Sarakinov, Bulgarian officer, member of the Supreme Macedonian Committee
 Petar Kirin, Bulgarian Revolutionary, commander of the Internal Macedonian Adrianople Revolutionary Organization (IMARO) detachment from Sarakinovo
 Spas Sarakinov, IMARO revolutionary and Bulgarian teacher
 Stoyan Sarakinov, Bulgarian Exarchate's priest
 Dimitar Malidanov, Slav Macedonian painter
 Andonis Sovicanis, Slav Macedonian soldier in Hellenic Army before Greek Civil War 1946-1949
 Nikola Dumurdzhanov, Slav Macedonian geologist

See also
List of settlements in the Pella regional unit

References

External links
Sarakinoi at the GTP Travel Pages

Populated places in Pella (regional unit)